is an above-ground metro station located in Tsuzuki-ku, Yokohama, Kanagawa Prefecture, Japan, operated by the Yokohama Municipal Subway. It is an interchange station for the Green Line and Blue Line (Line 3).

Lines
Center-Minami Station is served by the Blue Line and Green Line. It is 36.4 kilometers from the terminus of the Blue Line at Shōnandai Station and 4.8 kilometers from the terminus of the Green Line at Nakayama Station.

Station layout
Center-Minami Station has two elevated island platforms serving four tracks. The ground-level station building is located underneath the tracks and platforms.

Platforms

History
Center-Minami Station opened on March 18, 1993, when the Line 3 (later named the Blue Line) was extended from Shin-Yokohama Station to Azamino Station. Platform screen doors were installed in April 2007. Services on the Green Line started on March 30, 2008.

Surrounding area
Tsuzuki Ward Office
Tokyu Department Store
Showa University Hospital

See also
 List of railway stations in Japan

References

External links

 Center-Minami Station (Blue Line) 
 Center-Minami Station (Green Line) 

Railway stations in Kanagawa Prefecture
Railway stations in Japan opened in 1993
Blue Line (Yokohama)
Green Line (Yokohama)